James Mitchell Leisen (October 6, 1898 – October 28, 1972) was an American director, art director, and costume designer.

Film career
He entered the film industry in the 1920s, beginning in the art and costume departments. He directed his first film in 1933 with Cradle Song and became known for his keen sense of aesthetics in the glossy Hollywood melodramas and screwball comedies he turned out.

His best known films include Alberto Casella's  adaptation of Death Takes a Holiday and Murder at the Vanities, a musical mystery story (both 1934), as well as Midnight (1939) and Hold Back the Dawn (1941), both scripted by Billy Wilder. Easy Living (1937), written by Preston Sturges and starring Jean Arthur, was another hit for the director, who also directed Remember the Night (1940), the last film written by Sturges before he started directing his scripts as well.

Lady in the Dark (1944), To Each His Own (1946), and No Man of Her Own (1950) were later successes. Charles Brackett's comedy The Mating Season (1951) starring Gene Tierney, Miriam Hopkins and Thelma Ritter was an updated version of Leisen's earlier screwball comedies of the 1930s, and was also his last big movie success.

When his film career ended, Leisen directed episodes of such television series as Thriller, Shirley Temple's Storybook, The Twilight Zone, and The Girl from U.N.C.L.E.. He later became a nightclub owner.

Personal life
Though married, Leisen was reported to be gay or bisexual. According to Carolyn Roos, Leisen's longtime business manager's daughter, he had a very long relationship with dancer/actor/choreographer Billy Daniel until the 1950s (Daniel died in 1962). Leisen, with Daniel and dancer/actor Mary Parker, formed Hollywood Presents Inc. as a means of promoting both Daniel and Parker off-screen. Leisen died of heart disease in 1972, aged 74. His grave is located in Chapel of the Pines Crematory.

Awards
He garnered his sole Academy Award nomination in 1930 for Art Direction for Cecil B. DeMille's Dynamite. He directed Hold Back the Dawn (1941), which was nominated for the Academy Award for Best Picture.

Filmography (as director)

References

Further reading 
 Revised version of a 1973 biography.
 Kehr's review of the DVD releases of Easy Living (1937) and Midnight (1939).
 Melville is one of several critics who have been reassessing Leisen's contributions to cinema; he writes, "Leisen, glimpsed in this new light, is no longer a swishy hack. He's a subtle and stylish auteur who could add heart and humanity to the brittle sophistication of Billy Wilder, lend grace and elegance to the boisterous Americana of Preston Sturges. In his Biographical Dictionary of Film, David Thomson hails Leisen as "an expert at witty romantic comedies, too reliant on feeling to be screwball, too pleased with glamour to be satires – and thus less likely to attract critical attention.""
 This essay was written as an introduction to a retrospective series of showings of Leisen's films in 2008 at the Cinémathèque Française, which is in Paris, France. As does Melville, Rappaport speculates on how some of Billy Wilder's and Preston Sturges' scripts that Leisen directed would have fared if their writers had directed them instead.
  Shadoian is a film scholar who wrote the monograph Dreams and Dead Ends: The American Gangster Film (1978, 2003).

External links

1898 births
1972 deaths
People from Menominee, Michigan
American art directors
Film producers from Michigan
American costume designers
Burials at Chapel of the Pines Crematory
LGBT film directors
LGBT people from Michigan
Film directors from Michigan
20th-century American LGBT people